Róbert Kasza (born 5 April 1986 in Budapest) is a Hungarian modern pentathlete. He was on the gold medal-winning relay team at the 2011 World Modern Pentathlon Championships. He also qualified for and participated in the modern pentathlon at the 2012 Summer Olympics. Robert Kasza is represented by STRONGAA Management.

References

External links
 
 
 

Hungarian male modern pentathletes
Modern pentathletes at the 2012 Summer Olympics
Olympic modern pentathletes of Hungary
Sportspeople from Budapest
1986 births
Living people
Modern pentathletes at the 2020 Summer Olympics